9to5, National Association of Working Women is an organization established in 1973 that is dedicated to improving working conditions and ensuring the rights of women and families in the United States.

The group has its origins in 9to5 News, a newsletter that was first published in December 1972. About a year later, the newsletter's publishers announced the formation of Boston 9to5, a grassroots collective for women office workers that addressed issues such as low pay and lack of opportunities for advancement. One of the organization's earliest victories included a class-action suit filed against several Boston publishing companies that awarded the female plaintiffs $1.5 million in back pay. In 1975 the founders of 9to5 joined with the Service Employees International Union (SEIU) and formed Local 925 of the SEIU in Boston in order to help office workers gain access to collective bargaining rights.  In 1977, 9to5 Boston merged with Cleveland Women Working (est. 1975 primarily by Helen Williams) to create the Cleveland-based Working Women Organizing Project. Based in Cleveland from 1977-1993, the national organization was a coalition of like minded associations and was headed by Karen Nussbaum, one of Boston 9to5's founders. The group was later known as the National Association of Working Women. Members of this group met with Jane Fonda and served as an inspiration for the smash-hit comedy, 9 to 5, featuring Fonda, Dolly Parton and Dabney Coleman, among others.  In 1981, the National Association of Working Women formed a national-level partnership with SEIU and formed SEIU District 925, a nationwide labor union for office workers.

After several name changes, the organization adopted its current name in 1983, and "9to5, National Association of Working Women" evolved into the largest membership organization of working women in the United States. During the 1980s and 1990s, 9to5 focused on issues such as the effects of automation, pay inequities, medical leave, and racial and sexual harassment and discrimination. The organization effectively used the media and lobbied legislators as part of a campaign to warn the public of the health dangers of video display terminals (also known as VDTs) and has also used the media to draw attention to several sexual harassment cases in the 1990s.

As part of its educational efforts, 9to5 established the Job Retention Project in 1987 to assist office workers in developing time-management, goal-setting, and problem-solving skills. In addition, the organization publishes fact sheets, newsletters, and books, such as The Job/Family Challenge: A 9to5 Guide (1995), by Ellen Bravo, that keep workers abreast of current issues.

Among other issues, 9to5 actively promotes workplace policies such as paid sick leave, equal pay, and an end to discrimination for hiring or firing based on gender or sexual orientation. 9to5 additionally staffs a "Job Survival Helpline" to give support to women facing difficulties or challenges in the workplace.

The national organization has chapters in Milwaukee, Wisconsin, Colorado, California, and Atlanta, Georgia.

See also
Women's rights

References

External links

 9to5, National Association of Working Women (U.S.) Records. Schlesinger Library , Radcliffe Institute, Harvard University.
 9to5, National Association of Working Women (U.S.). Milwaukee Chapter Records. Schlesinger Library , Radcliffe Institute, Harvard University.

Organizations established in 1973
Women's occupational organizations
Human rights organizations based in the United States
Feminist organizations in the United States
History of women's rights in the United States
Workers' rights organizations
Organizations based in Milwaukee
Labor in the United States
Service Employees International Union
Women and employment